A renal diet is a diet aimed at keeping levels of fluids, electrolytes, and minerals balanced in the body in individuals with chronic kidney disease or who are on dialysis. Dietary changes may include the restriction of fluid intake, protein, and electrolytes including sodium, phosphorus, and potassium. Calories may also be supplemented if the individual is losing weight undesirably.

The diet may help limit the buildup of waste products within the body and reduce strain on the kidneys, as well as reduce blood pressure and lower the risk of fluid build-up around the heart and lungs. Phosphorus restriction can help maintain bone health, as phosphorus buildup in the blood results in the leaching of calcium from bones and subsequently an increased fracture risk. The evidence supporting uptake of a renal diet and a reduction in cardiovascular events and mortality is limited, but dietary interventions may increase health-related quality of life and estimated Glomerular Filtration Rate (eGFR) while lowering serum albumin and serum cholesterol levels.

The restrictiveness of a renal diet depends on the severity of the patient's kidney disease, and the diet should be undertaken with the advice of a dietician. Patients with comorbid conditions like diabetes may need to further alter their diets to meet the needs of those conditions simultaneously.

Who should be on a renal diet? 
Diet modification is recommended in those diagnosed with CKD stage 3-5 or GFR <60 mL/min/1.732 that are NOT on dialysis. Those with eGFR greater than or equal to <60 mL/min/1.732 are recommended to follow the general population dietary recommendations (DASH diet).

Sodium 
Sodium restriction in CKD has been studied and recommended in individuals w/ coexisting hypertension, volume overload or proteinuria. Sodium restriction to <2 g/day (<5 g/day of salt) has shown improved blood pressure control, improved volume control and reduced proteinuria. High sodium intake of above 6g/day has been shown to increase rates of cardiovascular disease, stroke and overall mortality.

Potassium 
Potassium management for individuals with CKD is variable and dependent on various factors including CKD stage/eGFR, serum potassium levels and concomitant use of potassium altering medications such as ACE inhibitors/ARBs. Therefore potassium regulation requires and individualized approach with the assistance of a dietician and physician.

Phosphorus and Calcium 
Increased serum phosphate levels in CKD is associated with poor bone health, increased risk of cardiovascular events and mortality. Although there isn’t enough evidence that dietary restriction of phosphorus leads to decreased serum phosphorus, KDOQI recommends a maximum of 0.8 to 1 g/day intake restriction of dietary phosphorus.

Serum phosphate levels in CKD are heavily influenced by calcium and parathyroid hormone levels. In CKD,  the kidneys are unable to make adequate amounts of vitamin D, resulting in decreased calcium absorption. Low calcium leads to parathyroid hormone release, which moves calcium and phosphorus out of bones and into the blood. Therefore calcium supplementation in CKD patients results in decreased PTH and decreased phosphorus levels. KDOQI recommends a calcium intake goal of 800 to 1000 mg/day (diet and medications combined). . Excessive calcium supplementation of 2000 mg/day for CKD patients may result in calcium deposition in other tissues leading to calcification.

Protein 
A low protein diet for individuals with non-dialysis CKD has shown to lower the rate of CKD progression and electrolyte balance. Low protein diets of <0.8 g/kg/day have shown improved CKD management with reduced serum phosphorus, serum urea nitrogen and reduced protein in the urine. A very low protein diet (0.28 g/kg/day) is not recommended due to the possibility of malnutrition. The National Kidney Foundation’s Kidney Disease Outcomes Quality Initiative (KDOQI) recommends a low protein diet of 0.55-0.6 g/kg/day but specific levels of protein intake varies for each individual and should be altered with the advice of a dietician and/or physician.

See also 
 List of diets

References

Diets